Angelo Lorenzetti (born  in Fano) is an Italian volleyball coach. He is the coach Italian Club Trentino. Lorenzetti former coach Italy u21 team, 
Padova, Verona, Piacenza and Modena. He firstly in Fano, before moving on to lead various junior and youth National Teams of Italy. He took charge of Trentino in the summer of 2016, replacing Radostin Stoychev, leading the side to the silver medal in the 2017 European CEV Cup. Under his guidance, Trentino were also runners-up in last year's Italian League and Italian Cup.

References

1964 births
Living people
Italian volleyball coaches